Wakehurst Football Club are a Northern Irish, intermediate football club who currently play in the Ballymena & Provincial Football League. The club, founded in 1969, hails from Ballymena, although home matches are played at Moyola Park's ground at Mill Meadow. Wakehurst formerly played at the second pitch at the Ballymena Showgrounds, home of Ballymena United, but for 2009–10 this pitch was deemed not to meet the criteria for the Championship, and home games were played at the ground of Tobermore United in Tobermore, County Londonderry, for that season; Wakehurst moved to Castledawson for 2010–11. It is the club's intention eventually to return to Ballymena. In 2016, the club was relegated from the Northern Ireland Football League and spent a season in the Ballymena & Provincial Football League before announcing their withdrawal from the competition.

Club colours are black, and white (home) and blue (away).  

The club is currently managed by John Clarke. 

The club returned to the Ballymena & Provincial League for the 2016–17 season and were joined by fellow Championship 2 drop outs, Glebe Rangers and Coagh United. At the end of the season they announced their withdrawal from football although indicated that it would be a one year hiatus rather than permanent.

The club played at junior level in the Ballymena & District League and Northern Amateur League until stepping up to intermediate football in 2003.

Players

Current First Team Squad

As of

Honours

Junior honours
County Antrim Junior Shield: 1
1989–90

References

External links
Club Website

Association football clubs established in 1969
Association football clubs in Northern Ireland
Association football clubs in County Londonderry
Sport in Ballymena
1969 establishments in Northern Ireland